Har-Zion or Har Zion ("Mount Zion") may refer to:

Meir Har-Zion (1934-2014), Israeli commando
 Temple Har Zion, Thornhill, Ontario, Canada, see List of synagogues in the Greater Toronto Area
 Har Zion Cemetery near the community of Collingdale, Pennsylvania, United States, where the Hermesprota Creek begins
Har Zion Synagogue, Wynnefield, Philadelphia, United States

See also
Mount Zion (disambiguation)